Fright Night is a 1985 horror film. 

Fright Night, Fright Night 2  or Fright Nights may also refer to:

Films
 Fright Night (1947 film), a short film starring The Three Stooges
 Fright Night (2011 film), the 2011 remake of the 1985 film
 Fright Night Part 2, the 1988 sequel to the 1985 film
 Fright Night 2: New Blood, the 2013 sequel to the 2011 film

Television
 Fright Night (TV series), a New York / Los Angeles television show
 "Fright Night", a season 4 episode of The Brady Bunch
 "Fright Night", a season 1 episode of The Carrie Diaries
 "Fright Night", a season 3 episode of Life with Derek
 "Fright Night", a season 3 episode of Night Gallery
 "Fright Night", a season 7 episode of Perfect Strangers
 "Fright Night," a season 23 episode of Arthur

Theme park events
 Fright Nights, a seasonal Halloween event at Warner Bros. Movie World in Australia
 Fright Nights, a Halloween event during October and November in Thorpe Park
 Fright Nights, the original title of the first year of Halloween Horror Nights at Universal Studios Florida
 Fright Nights, the original title of Six Flags Fright Fest at Six Flags AstroWorld
 Fright Nights, a Halloween event during October and November in Walibi Holland

Other uses
Fright Night (comic line), a comic book line
 Fright Night (comic series), a comic book series
 Fright Night (video game), a 1988 game for the Amiga platform based on the 1985 film
 Fright Night (album), an album by power metal band Stratovarius

See also
Night Fright, a 1967 American horror film
"Night Fright" (Arthur), a season 2 episode of Arthur